Chhori Maiya Maharjan, a resident of Kathmandu went missing on 18 February 2012. She was 51 year old when she went missing. In 2021, it was listed as twelve most mysterious cases of Nepal in recent history.

Early response
The Ministry of Home Affairs formed a committee on 12 August 2012 led by Gokarna Mani Duwadi, Joint Secretary of the ministry. The committee was supposed to submit a report within seven days.

One year later
Two years later she went missing, in 2013, Asian Human Rights Commission issued an appeal for a stronger investigation into the disappearance.

Two years later
Two years later she went missing, in 2014, Asian Human Rights Commission issued an open letter demanding justice. On 2 June 2014, Kathmandu District Court on Monday gave a clean chit to Nikki Singh, the prime accused in the disappearance. The family members condemned the judgment as partial. It was also reported that the court arrived at its judgement at 9:50 pm, while the working hours are only for 5 pm, and the judge did not ask permission for over time work.

Investigation
It was reavealed that the prime accused Nikki Singh owed Maharjan around 5 million. The investigation by the Ministry of Home Affairs stated that Maharjan was forcefully disappeared, and that there’s strong evidence of Singh's.

2021 resurge
The case took a resurge on social media in 2021. On 31 July 2021, a Facebook page Routine of Nepal Banda posted about the case ten years ago. It led to upsurge in search about the case. #JusticeForChhorimaiyaMaharjan hashtag trended for weeks in Nepal the same month. An online media Ukera dedicated several investigative articles on the case. It also marked attempts of cyber hacking to take down the website of Ukera.

People over social media called out celebrities Priyanka Karki and Zenisha Moktan on their involvement in the case, as Nikki Singh was Karki was Singh's sister's daughter and Moktan was sister's husband's daughter in law.

Active campaigns
As of 2021, a petition was launched demanding re-opening of the case. A pressure committee namely Chhori Maiya Khoji Dabab Samuha (Chhori Maiya Search Pressure Committee) is active on Facebook.

See also
List of people who disappeared

References

2012 in Nepal
2010s in Nepal
2010s missing person cases
Missing person cases in Nepal